Kings Park West is a census-designated place in the eastern USA, in Fairfax County, Virginia, southwest of Washington, D.C. The population as of the 2010 census was 13,390.

Geography
The CDP is located in central Fairfax County, south of the city of Fairfax. It is bordered to the north by the George Mason CDP, to the northeast by Long Branch, to the southeast by Burke, and to the south by Fairfax Station. The CDP border follows Braddock Road on the north, Guinea Road on the southeast, Zion Drive on the southwest, and State Route 123 (Ox Road) on the west.

History
Following the success of its Kings Park development earlier in the decade, Richmarr Construction Corporation started on Kings Park West. Construction began  in mid-1967 and the first homes were available in 1968. The development was built in sections, with the final section completed in 1986.

Kings Park West includes Laurel Ridge Elementary School, dating from 1970. On the development's west boundary, Robinson Secondary School opened in 1971.

See also
Kings Park

References

External links
Kings Park West Civic Association

Census-designated places in Fairfax County, Virginia
Washington metropolitan area
Census-designated places in Virginia